Ignatius Bedros XVI Batanian (in Armenian Իգնատիոս Պետրոս ԺԶ Պաթանեան French Ignace Pierre XVI Batanian; 15 February 1899 in Mardin, Ottoman Empire – 9 October 1979, in Lebanon) was  Armenian Catholic Catholicos-Patriarch of Cilicia from 1962 until his resignation in 1976. His election came as replacement of  cardinal patriarch Gregory-Petros XV Agagianian, who had been assigned responsibilities with the Roman Catholic Church at the Vatican.

Priesthood
He was born as Louis Batanian in Mardin, Ottoman Empire. He was ordained a priest in 1921 when he was 22 years old. He was consecrated as bishop on 29 October 1933, as Archbishop of Mardin of the Armenians (1933–1940) and titular Archbishop of Gabula (1940–1952). He was assigned Archbishop of Aleppo of the Armenians in northern Syria (1952–1959) and finally titular Archbishop of Colonia in Armenia (1959–1962).

He became Auxiliary Bishop of Cilicia of the Armenians (in Lebanon) on 24 April 1959 to Catholicos Cardinal Gregory-Petros XV Agagianian until 4 September 1962, when he was elected as Catholicos-Patriarch of the Armenian Catholics on that day. His official reign as Patriarch continued from 15 November 1962 until 22 April 1976 when he resigned because of legal age. He constructed the new convent of Bzommar and the Armenian Catholic orphanage of Anjar, Lebanon. He witnessed as Patriarch the first two very difficult years of the Lebanese Civil War.

Death
He died on 9 October 1979 in Lebanon, aged 80.

See also
 List of Armenian Catholic Patriarchs of Cilicia

References

External links
Biography on official site of the Armenian Catholic Church 

Armenian Catholic Patriarchs of Cilicia
1979 deaths
1899 births
People from Mardin
Armenians from the Ottoman Empire
20th-century Eastern Catholic bishops
Armenian Eastern Catholics